The Munising Group or Formation is a  thick, white to light grey Cambrian sedimentary unit  that crops out in Michigan and (to a lesser extent) Ontario.  At one end of its extent, it comprises a basal conglomerate overlain by the Chapel Rock Member and the Miners Castle Member; elsewhere, it comprises the Eau Claire, Galesville (=Dresbach), and Franconia Members. Anhydritic evaporite deposits are present in places. The conglomerate was deposited by rivers in flood, with the Chapel Rock member, which contains deltaic deposits, representing transgression as the conglomerate cones became submerged; the Miners Castle member was deposited further from the shoreline, representing shelf deposits. Its uppermost strata may be Early Ordovician in age, and contain conodonts, trilobites and phosphatic moulds of brachiopods, ostrocoderm fish and gastropods.

The Munising lies unconformably above the Jacobsville Formation.

References 

Geologic formations of Michigan
Geologic formations of Ontario
Cambrian System of North America
Cambrian Michigan
Cambrian Canada
Conglomerate formations
Fluvial deposits
Deltaic deposits
Evaporite deposits
Fossiliferous stratigraphic units of North America
Paleontology in Michigan